David Kingsley Harper (born 1967 in Middlesbrough, England) is an antiques expert, artist, speaker and writer.

Harper's first television role was in 2005 as presenter of Channel 4's Natural Born Dealers. He has been featured on Through the Keyhole and Ready Steady Cook, and has presented pieces for The Heaven and Earth Show, The One Show, Inside Out and Countryfile Summer Diaries.

In April 2010 he won the first series of Antiques Road Trip, raising £2488 for Children in Need from a starting budget of £200. In addition to regular appearances on Antiques Road Trip, he appears as an antiques expert on Bargain Hunt, Put Your Money Where Your Mouth Is and Cash in the Attic.

Personal life
Harper grew up in England and Zimbabwe. His early career involved shipping antiques to and from the United States. He later became the director of a British PLC company importing antique style rubberwood furniture from the Far East. He has homes in Barnard Castle and London.

References

British antiquarians
1967 births
British television personalities
Living people
People from Middlesbrough